San Diego Municipality may refer to:
 San Diego, Cesar, Colombia
 San Diego, Zacapa, Guatemala
 San Diego Municipality, Carabobo, Venezuela

municipality name disambiguation pages